Paulus Gerardus Josephus Maria Polman,  (born 11 July 1956) is a Dutch businessman and author. He was the chief executive officer (CEO) of the British/Dutch consumer goods company Unilever. Polman is also the author of Net Positive: How Courageous Companies Thrive by Giving More Than They Take.

Whilst CEO of Unilever from 2009 to 2019, he set an ambitious vision to fully decouple business growth from its overall environmental footprint and increase the company’s positive social impact through the Unilever Sustainable Living Plan. During Polman’s tenure, he provided a return vastly superior to rivals and more than double that of the FTSE index. In 2018, the Financial Times called Polman “a standout CEO of the past decade.”

In 2019, he co-founded a new organization called IMAGINE with Jeff Seabright (formerly the Chief Sustainability Officer of Unilever) and Kees Kruythoff, to help businesses "eradicate poverty and inequality, and stem runaway climate change." Polman is also an active Venture Capital investor having participated in several high profile fundraises for climate and mission focused companies. As a result of his work championing causes around climate change, inequality, and sustainability, Polman has become a prominent global figure in the push for more responsible business.

Early life
Polman was born and grew up in the Dutch city of Enschede, in a Catholic family with three brothers and two sisters, the son of a tyre company executive father and a former schoolteacher mother.

Polman had hoped to become a doctor, but medical school places were allocated by lottery and he was not chosen. Instead, he studied at the University of Groningen, graduating with a BBA/BA in 1977. He completed his MA in Economics and MBA in Finance and International Marketing in 1979 at University of Cincinnati.

In June 2014 Polman received his honorary doctorate during the 400th anniversary of the University of Groningen.

On May 18, 2018, Polman received his Honorary Doctorate of Humane Letters from George Mason University. As the day's Commencement speaker, Dr. Polman declared, "Any system where too many feel they are not participating or are left behind will ultimately rebel against itself." Capturing the spirit of his own sense of purpose, he continued, "The world we want will only be achieved when we choose action over indifference, courage over comfort, and solidarity over division."

Career

Procter & Gamble
Polman worked for Procter & Gamble for 27 years, starting in 1979 as a cost analyst, becoming managing director of P&G U.K. from 1995 to 1998, president of global fabric care from 1998 to 2001, and group president for Europe in 2001.

Nestlé
Polman then joined Nestlé in 2006 as chief financial officer and in February 2008 became vice president and head of the Americas.

Unilever
On 1 January 2009, Polman succeeded Patrick Cescau as chief executive officer of Unilever. Under Polman's leadership, Unilever has set a target to decouple its growth from its overall environmental footprint and improve its social impact through the Unilever Sustainable Living Plan. Polman has argued that, in a volatile world of finite resources, running a business sustainably is vital for its long-term growth and also mitigates risk and reduces costs. Unilever has now seen eight years of top line growth, averaging twice the rate of overall market growth, whilst improving the bottom line and delivering a total shareholder return of 290%. Bernstein's 2017 Blackbook entitled 'European Food and HPC: 10-Year Global Market Share Analysis' rated Unilever top-of-class for absolute market share gains (ex-M&A) and a proportion of its categories with gains. It also compared medium-term operating expectations to current valuations, leading to an Outperform rating on Unilever. Some shareholders, however, have worried that Polman's focus on sustainability has become more important to him than the financial performance of Unilever after the company missed sales targets for six out of eight quarters in 2013 and 2014. Polman, who scrapped short-term targets at the company, has argued that the failure to meet targets is a result of erratic currency fluctuations and the slow-down in emerging markets since 2013. Paul Polman has said that he has ambitions to increase the company's sales in emerging markets from the current 57% (47% in 2008) to 70% of turnover. Procter & Gamble, by contrast, make only 37% of sales in emerging markets and Nestlé 43%. In 2009, Polman decided to make many significant management changes in order to improve Unilever's revenue in each of its business pillars.

In 2016, Polman's total compensation was €8.3 million including a basic salary of €1.2million and other benefits (2015, €10.2 million).

In 2018, Unilever supported the abolition of Dutch dividend-tax, even though over 80% of Dutch citizens were against the tax-cut as it meant a loss of about 2 billion euros of tax-revenue a year for the Dutch state. In October 2018, it was announced Unilever has cancelled plans to move headquarters from London to Rotterdam. In November 2018, Polman announced he was stepping down as chief executive officer of Unilever at the end of 2018 with Alan Jope succeeding him.

Imagine
In July 2019, Polman announced the formation of a new group - Imagine - to help combat poverty and climate change. The foundation and corporation aims to help companies meet UN global goals for sustainable development.

Other responsibilities
Polman is a former  chair of the World Business Council for Sustainable Development and sat on the board of directors of the Consumer Goods Forum, leading its sustainability efforts. He is also a member of board of the UN Global Compact. At the invitation of the UN Secretary General Ban Ki-moon, Polman served as one of the 27 members of the UN High Level Panel of Eminent Persons on the Post-2015 Development Agenda. At the invitation of former Mexican President, Felipe Calderón, Polman served on the International Council of the Global Commission on the Economy and Climate.He has co-authored a report published by the International Food Policy Research Institute (IFPRI) that criticizes the efforts of the SDGs as not ambitious enough. Instead of aiming for an end to poverty by 2030, the report "An Ambitious Development Goal: Ending Hunger and Undernutrition by 2025" calls for a greater emphasis on eliminating hunger and undernutrition and achieving that in 5 years less, by 2025.
Polman co-founded the Dutch Sustainable Growth Coalition, led by former Dutch prime minister Jan Peter Balkenende. He is a member of the World Economic Forum International Business Council, the Global Taskforce for Scaling up Nutrition (SUN) and was part of the European Resource Efficiency Platform Working Group, chaired by European Commissioner Janez Potočnik. He was co-chair of the World Economic Forum 2012. He is a counsellor of One Young World and trustee of the Leverhulme Trust. Polman was co-chair of the B-20 Food Security Taskforce.
Polman served on the board of Unilever from 2009 to 2019. He formerly served on the boards of Dow and Alcon. Polman is also part of the Leadership Vanguard, an initiative that seeks to identify, support and mobilise the next generation of leaders, focuses on redefining value. He has been a member of IESE's International Advisory Board (IAB) since 2015.

He is president of the Kilimanjaro Blind Trust, a foundation he created alongside fellow climber Erik Weihenmayer, to benefit blind children in Africa, and chair of the Perkins International Advisory Board.

In 2016 Polman was selected by former UN secretary-general Ban Ki-moon to be an SDG Advocate, tasked with helping build widespread support for the UN's Sustainable Development Goals. He was again appointed in 2019 by the current Secretary-General António Guterres.

Polman is co-chair of the Global Commission for the Economy and Climate, with Nicholas Stern and Ngozi Okonjo-Iweala.

He is a member of The B Team, chairing the group from August 2018 to September 2021.

Personal life
Polman is married to Kim Polman, with whom he has three sons.

Polman once considered joining the priesthood.

Selected awards
Polman has received awards for his leadership and efforts in sustainable development that include:
 European Business Leader of the year by Wall Street Journal/CNBC (2003)
 Investor Magazine CEO of the year (2010,2011,2012)
 Award for Responsible Capitalism (2012)
 INSEAD Business Leader for the World Award (2012)
 WWF's Duke of Edinburgh Conservation Medal (2013)
 Rainforest Alliance Lifetime Achievement Award (2014)
 David Rockefeller Bridging Leadership award - Synergos (2014)
 Doctor Honoris Causa of Business School Lausanne (2014)
 Oslo Business for Peace Award (2015) 
 Chevalier de la Légion d'honneur (2016)
 Singapore Government Public Service Star - Distinguished Friends of Singapore (2016)
 Enactus Entrepreneurial Spirit Award (2017)
 Honorary Knight Commander of the Order of the British Empire (2018)
 Treaties of Nijmegen Medal (2018)
 Honorary Doctorate of Humane Letters from George Mason University (2018)
Rrecipient of the Lifetime Achievement Award (Champions of the Earth) in 2015.

References

1956 births
Living people
Dutch chief executives in the food industry
Honorary Knights Commander of the Order of the British Empire
Unilever people
Procter & Gamble people
Nestlé people
University of Groningen alumni
University of Cincinnati alumni
People from Enschede
20th-century Dutch businesspeople
21st-century Dutch businesspeople